The year 1744 in architecture involved some significant events.

Events

Buildings and structures

Buildings

Giác Lâm Pagoda in Saigon is built by Lý Thụy Long.
Sabil-Kuttab of Katkhuda in Cairo, designed by Katkhuda of Egypt ('Abd al Rahman Katkhuda'), is built.
Tombul Mosque in Shumen, Ottoman Empire, is completed.
St Botolph's Aldgate church in the City of London, designed by George Dance the Elder, is completed.
St John the Baptist's Church, Knutsford in England, designed by J. Garlive, is completed.
Twelve Collegia in Saint Petersburg, designed by Domenico Trezzini and Theodor Schwertfeger, is completed.
The second Summer Palace in Saint Petersburg, designed by Francesco Bartolomeo Rastrelli, is completed.
Remodelling of the Hirschholm Palace in Denmark to a design by Lauritz de Thurah is completed.
Remodelling of the Prince's Mansion, Copenhagen in Denmark by Nicolai Eigtved is completed.
The Würzburg Residence in Germany, designed by Balthasar Neumann with Johann Lukas von Hildebrandt, Maximilian von Welsch, Robert de Cotte and Germain Boffrand, is completed (begun 1720).
Morelia Cathedral in Mexico is completed (begun 1660).
Alamo Mission in San Antonio is begun.
Christ Church, Philadelphia, is completed.
Holden Chapel at Harvard University is completed.
St. Peter's Church in the Great Valley of Chester County, Pennsylvania, is built.
Withcote Chapel in Leicestershire, England, is remodelled.
St. Martin's Church, Warsaw, is reconstructed to a design by Karol Bay at about this date.

Births
August 7 (bapt.) – Thomas Harrison, English architect (d. 1829)
September 20 or 21 – Giacomo Quarenghi, Italian-born architect (d. 1817)

Deaths

Architecture
Years in architecture
18th-century architecture